Arts media is the material and tools used by an artist, composer or designer to create a work of art, for example, "pen and ink" where the pen is the tool and the ink is the material. Here is a list of types of art and the media used within those types.

Architecture

Cement, concrete, mortar
Cob
Glass
Metal
Stone, brick
Wood

Carpentry

Adhesives
Wood (timber)

Ceramics

Bone china
Clay
Glaze
Porcelain
Pottery
Terracotta

Drawing

Common drawing materials 

Acrylic paint
Chalk
Charcoal
Conté
Crayon
Gouache
Graphite
Ink
Oil paint
Glass paint
Pastel 
Pixel
Sketch
Tempera
Watercolor
Glitter

Common supports (surfaces) for drawing 

Canvas
Card stock
Concrete
Fabric
Glass
Human body
Metal
Paper
Plaster
Scratchboard
Stone
Vellum
Wood

Common drawing tools and methods 

Brush
Finger
Pen 
Ballpoint pen
Fountain pen
Gel pen
Technical pen
Marker
Pencil
Mechanical pencil (clutch, screw, and ratchet)
Colored pencil
Stylus
Charcoal

Electronic

Graphic art software and 3D computer graphics
Word processors and desktop publishing software
Digital photography and digital cinematography
Specialized input devices (e.g. variable pressure sensing tablets and touchscreens)
Digital printing
Programming languages

Film

Animation
Cel animation
Computer animation
Cutout animation
Drawn-on-film animation
Stop motion
Live action
Puppet film

Video art
Single-channel video
Video installation

Film, as a form of mass communication, is itself also considered a medium in the sense used by fields such as sociology and communication theory (see also mass media). These two definitions of medium, while they often overlap, are different from one another: television, for example, utilizes the same types of artistic media as film, but may be considered a different medium from film within communication theory.

Food

A chef's tools and equipment, including ovens, stoves, grills, and griddles. Specialty equipment may be used, including salamanders, French tops, woks, tandoors, and induction burners.

Glass 
Glassblowing, Glass fusing, colouring and marking methods.

Installation 

Installation art is a site-specific form of sculpture that can be created with any material. An installation can occupy a large amount of space, create an ambience, transform/disrupt the space, exist in the space. One way to distinguish an installation from a sculpture (this may not apply to every installation) is to try to imagine it in a different space. If the objects present difficulties in a different space than the original, it is probably an installation.

Literature

Traditional writing media

Digital word processor
Internet websites
Letterpress printing
Computer printers
Marker
Pen and ink or *quill
Pencil

Common bases for writing 

Card stock
Paper, perhaps ruled
Vellum

Natural world

Floral design
Rock
Soil
Vegetation
Water

Painting

Common paint media 

Acrylic paint
Blacklight paint
Encaustic paint
Fresco
Gesso
Glaze
Gouache
Ink
Latex paint
Oil paint
Primer
Ink wash (sumi-e)
Tempera or poster paint
Vinyl paint (toxic/poisonous)
Vitreous enamel
Watercolor

Uncommon paint media 

Various bodily fluids and excrement including elephant dung
Solar energy
Garlic
Rust
Coffee
Onion
Coconut juice
Mud
Black palm
Tomato
Soy sauce
Staple wire
Ochre (Yellow, red, white or charcoal)

Supports for painting

Architectural structures
Canvas
Ceramics
Cloth
Glass
Human body (typically for tattoos)
Metal
Paper
Paperboard
Vellum
Wall
Wood

Common tools and methods 
Action painting
Aerosol paint
Airbrush
Batik
Brush
Cloth
Paint roller or paint pad
Palette knife
Sponge
Pencil
Finger

Mural techniques
Muralists use many of the same media as panel painters, but due to the scale of their works, use different techniques. Some such techniques include:
Aerosol paint
Digital painting
Fresco
Image projector
Mosaic
Pouncing

Graphic narrative media

Comics creators use many of the same media as traditional painters.

Performing arts

The performing arts is a form of entertainment that is created by the artist's own body, face and presence as a medium. There are many skills and genres of performance; dance, theatre and re-enactment being examples. Performance art is a performance that may not present a conventional formal linear narrative.

Photography

In photography a photosensitive surface is used to capture an optical still image, usually utilizing a lens to focus light. Some media include:
Digital image sensor
Photographic film
Potassium dichromate
Potassium ferricyanide and ferric ammonium citrate
Silver nitrate

Printmaking
In the art of printmaking, "media" tends to refer to the technique used to create a print. Common media include:

Aquatint
Collotype
Computer printing
Dye-sublimation printer
Inkjet printer (sometimes called giclée printing)
Laser printer
Solid ink printer
Thermal printer
Embossing
Engraving
Etching
Intaglio (printmaking)
Letterpress (literature)
Linocut
Lithography
Mezzotint
Moku hanga
Monotype
Offset printing
Photographic printing
Planographic printing
Printing press
Relief printing
Linocut
Metalcut
Relief etching
Wood engraving
Woodcut
Screen-printing
Woodblock printing

Sculpture

In sculpting, a solid structure and textured surface is shaped or combined using substances and components, to form a three-dimensional object. The size of a sculptured work can be built very big and could be considered as architecture, although more commonly a large statue or bust, and can be crafted very small and intricate as jewellery, ornaments and decorative reliefs.

Materials

Carving media

Bone carving
Bronze
Gemstones
Glass
Granite
Ice
Ivory
Marble
Plaster
Stone
Wax
Wood

Casting media
Cement
Ceramics
Metal
Plaster
Plastic
Synthetic resin
Wax

Modeling media
Clay
Papier-mâché
Plaster
polystyrene
Sand
Styrofoam

Assembled media

Beads
Corrugated fiberboard (cardboard)
Edible material
Foil
Found objects
Glue and other adhesives
Paperboard
Textile
Wire
Wood

Finishing materials
Acids to create a patina (corrosive)
Glaze
Polychrome
Wax

Tools

Bristle brush
Chisel and hammer (modern pneumatic)
Clamp or vise
Hammer or mallet (modern pneumatic)
Kiln for heating ceramics and metals
Knife
Pliers
Potter's wheel
Power tools
Sandpaper
Saw
Scraper
Snips
Welding and cutting torch
Wirecutter

Sound

The art of sound can be singular or a combination of speech or objects and crafted instruments, to create sounds, rhythms and music for a range of sonic hearing purposes. See also music and sound art.

Technical products

The use of technical products as an art medium is a merging of applied art and science, that may involve aesthetics, efficiency and ergonomics using various materials.

Textiles
In the art of textiles a soft and flexible material of fibers or yarn is formed by spinning wool, flax, cotton, or other material on a spinning wheel and crocheting, knitting, macramé (knotting), weaving, or pressing fibres together (felt) to create a work.

See also

 Collage
 Conceptual art
 Decorative arts
 Design tool
 Fashion design
 Fine art
 Fire performance
 Fresco
 Graffiti
 Graphic arts
 Liberal arts
 List of pen types, brands and companies
 Medium specificity
 Mixed media
 Multimedia
 New materials in 20th-century art
 Plastic arts
 Publishing
 Pyrotechnics
 Recording medium
 Stationery
 Video game art

References

External links 
Media (artists' materials) — definition from the Getty Art & Architecture Thesaurus.
Artistic Medium, Internet Encyclopedia of Philosophy

01
Media
Media
Ceramic materials
Painting materials
Sculpture materials